Line 1 (Blue) is one of the six lines that make up the São Paulo Metro and one of the thirteen lines that make up the Metropolitan Rail Transportation Network. It was the first line built for the São Paulo Metro and also the first metro line built in Brazil. It links Tucuruvi Station to Jabaquara Station. Construction began in the late 1960s and was completed in the early 1970s.

History
Originally called North-South Line, line 1 began construction on December 14, 1968. Commercial operation began September 14, 1974, with trains running in the first seven kilometers between Jabaquara and Vila Mariana stations. On this first stretch, the daily service lasted from 10 am to 3 pm.

The choice of this route was motivated by the nonexistence of alternatives for collective rail transport for the residents of Santana and Jabaquara, and also to relieve the already complicated traffic in the city's Center. The Consortium that won the bid for the construction of the line was HMD, an association of two German companies, Hochtief and Deconsult, and the Brazilian Montreal. This consortium applied the newest technologies available at the time, such as stainless steel cars, automatic train control and signaling system, third biometallic track, electric car traction and potent electronics, making the São Paulo Metro one of the fastest and most modern in the world.

In 1975 it was expanded, first to Liberdade, then to Santana.

In 1978 the Sé station was opened.

In 1998 the line expanded to Tucuruvi, because Santana station didn't settle the number from uses.

Moema branch 

When the subway was projected in 1968, it had a planning to include, besides the North-South Line (current Line 1-Blue), other two branches: Paulista (current Line 2-Green) and Moema.

Moema Branch would start at Paraíso station and follow underneath Avenida 23 de Maio, until Moema neighbourhood.

On the upper platform towards Tucuruvi, heading towards the beginning of the platform, there are two granite tracks, similar to the ones at other stations platforms. Between these tracks, there's the Metro standard rubber floor. This floor is, actually, a siding, which was installed above the branch tracks. However, the line doesn't have a third track, not allowing the train park. On the beginning of the platform, a wall separates the rest of the branch. Inside this wall, there are two other tracks of the branch, which connects with Line 1 right after Paraíso station, towards Tucuruvi. It is currently used for the parking of Metro maintenance machines.

Stations

Gallery

References

Line 01
Sao 01
Railway lines opened in 1974